L'Aube (The Dawn) may refer to:

 L'Aube (newspaper), French newspaper published from 1932 to 1951
 "L'Aube Nouvelle", national anthem of Benin
 The Aube, department of France
 Stade de l'Aube, multi-use stadium in Troyes, France
 Dawn (1985 film), 1985 French-Hungarian drama film
 L'Aube, a poetry collection of 1904 by Louis Pergaud